AXW may refer to:

 Another Experiment by Women Film Festival, a film festival founded in New York City in 2010 by Lili White
 Axway Software, (Euronext ticker code AXW), an American publicly held information technology company